KH domain-containing, RNA-binding, signal transduction-associated protein 1 is a protein that in humans is encoded by the KHDRBS1 gene.

This gene encodes a member of the K homology domain-containing, RNA-binding, signal transduction-associated protein family. The encoded protein appears to have many functions and may be involved in a variety of cellular processes, including alternative splicing, cell cycle regulation, RNA 3'-end formation, tumorigenesis, and regulation of human immunodeficiency virus gene expression.

Function 

Sam68 (the Src-Associated substrate in Mitosis of 68 kDa) is officially called KHDRBS1 (KH domain containing, RNA binding, signal transduction associated 1). Sam68 is a KH-type RNA binding protein that recognizes U(U/A)AA direct repeats with relative high affinity. Sam68 is predominantly nuclear and its major function in the nucleus is to regulate alternative splicing by recognizing RNA sequences neighboring the included/excluded exon(s).

Clinical significance 
Sam68 influences the alternative splicing of a number of genes central to processes such as neurogenesis and adipogenesis as well as diseases such as spinal muscular atrophy (SMA) and cancer.

Neurogenesis 
Sam68 was demonstrated to be involved in the alternative splicing of mRNAs implicated in normal neurogenesis using splicing-sensitive microarrays. Sam68 was also shown to participate in the epithelial-to-mesenchymal transition by regulating the alternative splicing of SF2/ASF. Sam68 was shown to regulate the activity-dependent alternative splicing of the neurexin-1 in the central nervous system with implications for neurodevelopment disorders.

Adipogenesis 
Sam68 influences alternative splicing of the mTOR kinase contributing to the lean phenotype observed in the Sam68 deficient mice.

Spinal muscular atrophy 
The role of Sam68 was further highlighted in spinal muscular atrophy (SMA), as Sam68 promotes the skipping of exon 7 leading to a non-functional SMN2 protein.

Cancer 
Sam68 regulates the alternative splicing of a number of cancer-related genes.

Direct evidence for the involvement of Sam68 in alternative splicing has been shown in promoting the inclusion of the variable exon 5 (v5) in CD44 correlating with cell migration potential. CD44 is a cell surface protein whose expression has been linked to cancer, with its expression predicting prognosis in a number of tumour types. In prostate cancer, Sam68 also  interacts with splicing complex proteins KHDRBS3 (T-STAR) and Metadherin (MTDH) which also alter CD44 splicing. Subsequently, the knockdown of Sam68 has been shown to delay LNCaP prostate cancer cells proliferation.

In addition, Sam68 in conjunction with hnRNPA1 influences the choice of the alternative 5' splice sites of Bcl-x regulating pro-survival and apoptotic pathways.

The RNA binding activity of Sam68 is regulated by post-translational modifications such that Sam68 is often referred to as a STAR (Signal Transduction Activator of RNA) protein by which signals from growth factors or soluble tyrosine kinases, such as Src family kinases, act to regulate cellular RNA processes such as alternative splicing. For example, the Sam68-dependent CD44 alternative splicing of exon v5 is regulated by ERK phosphorylation of Sam68 and Bcl-x alternative splicing is regulated by the p59fyn-dependent phosphorylation of Sam68.

Sam68 is also downstream of the epidermal growth factor receptor (EGFR), hepatocyte growth factor (HGF)/Met receptor (c-Met), leptin and tumor necrosis factor (TNF) receptors. While the role of Sam68 in these pathways is slowly emerging much remains to be determined. Sam68 has also been shown to re-localize in the cytoplasm near the plasma membrane, where it functions to transport and regulate the translation of certain mRNAs and regulates cell migration.

The many roles of Sam68 in cancer have been reviewed by Bielli et al.,.

Gene knockout studies 

Sam68-deficient mice were generated by targeted disruption of exons 4-5 of the sam68 gene, which encode the functional region of the KH domain. The genotypes of the offspring from heterozygote intercrosses exhibited a Mendelian segregation at E18.5. Despite the lack of visible deformity, many of the Sam68-/- pups died at birth of unknown causes. Sam68+/- mice were phenotypically normal and Sam68-/- pups that survived the peri-natal period invariably lived to old age. Sam68-/- mice weighed less than Sam68+/+ littermates and magnetic resonance imaging analysis confirmed that young Sam68-/- mice exhibited a profound reduction in adiposity, although food intake was similar. Moreover, Sam68-/- mice were protected against dietary-induced obesity. Sam68 deficient preadipocytes (3T3-L1 cells) had impaired adipogenesis and Sam68-/- mice had ~45% less adult derived stem cells (ADSCs) in their stromal vascular fraction (SVF) from WAT.

Tumour formation in vivo 
Sam68-/- mice did not develop tumors and showed no immunological or other major illnesses. Sam68-/- mice did, however, have difficulty breeding due to male infertility and female subfertility. The Sam68-null mice exhibited motor coordination defects and fell from the rotating drum at lower speeds and prematurely compared to the wild-type controls. Sam68-/- mice are protected against age-induced osteoporosis. Using the mammary tumor virus-polyoma middle T-antigen (MMTV-PyMT) mouse model of mammary tumorigenesis, it was shown that reduced Sam68 expression decreases tumor burden and metastasis. Kaplan-Meier curves showed that loss of one sam68 allele (PyMT; Sam68+/-) was associated with a significant delay in the onset of palpable tumors and a significant reduction in tumor multiplicity. These findings suggest that Sam68 is required for PyMT-induced mammary tumorigenesis. The knockdown of Sam68 expression in PyMT-derived mammary cells reduced the number of lung tumor foci in athymic mice, suggesting that Sam68 is also required for mammary tumor metastasis.

References

Further reading